Calamotropha xantholeuca is a moth in the family Crambidae. It was described by Edward Meyrick in 1933. It is found in the Democratic Republic of the Congo.

References

Crambinae
Moths described in 1933